Gutmann is a German or Jewish surname, colloquially meaning "husband", "yeoman", or "working man" (as opposed to "noble" or "gentleman").

Notable people with the name include:

 Adolphe Gutmann (1819–1882), German pianist and composer
 Amy Gutmann (born 1949), American academic and president of the University of Pennsylvania
 Bessie Pease Gutmann (1876-1960), American artist and illustrator 
 Edmund Gutmann (1841-1918), Croatian nobleman, industrialist, and co-founder of Belišće, Croatia
 Elisabeth von Gutmann (1875-1947), Princess of Liechtenstein
 Friedrich Gutmann (died April 1944), Dutch banker and art collector
 Galit Gutmann (born 1972), Israeli actress and fashion model
Gerrie Gutmann (1921–1969), American post-surrealist painter
 Hugo Gutmann (1880–1971), German-Jewish veteran of World War I who was Adolf Hitler's superior officer during the war
 John Gutmann (1905–1998), American photographer and painter
 Mike Gutmann (born 1962), Swiss cyclist
 Otmar Gutmann (1937–1993), German television producer, animator, and director
 Peter Gutmann (computer scientist), New Zealand computer scientist who invented the Gutmann method
 Peter Gutmann (journalist) (born 1949), American journalist and attorney
 *Tobias Gutmann Feder (–1817), Maskilic writer, poet, and grammarian
 Viktor Gutmann (1891–1946), Croatian nobleman and industrialist 
 Wilhelm Isak, Ritter von Gutmann (1826-1895), Austrian entrepreneur
 Willi Gutmann (1927–2013), Swiss sculptor

See also 
 Gutman
 Guttmann
 Guttman

 Surnames of German origin